The men's mass start race of the 2014–15 ISU Speed Skating World Cup 3, arranged in Sportforum Hohenschönhausen, in Berlin, Germany, was held on 7 December 2014.

Lee Seung-hoon of South Korea won the race, while Arjan Stroetinga of the Netherlands came second, and Bart Swings of Belgium came third.

Results
The race took place on Sunday, 7 December, scheduled in the afternoon session, at 16:14.

References

Men mass start
3